Centro Sportivo Maruinense, commonly known as Maruinense, or as CSM is a Brazilian football club based in Maruim, Sergipe state. They competed twice the Série C. The club was formerly known as Socialista Sport Club.

History
The club was founded on April 3, 1917, as Socialista Sport Club, being renamed to Centro Sportivo Maruinense in the late 1960s as a way to attract more supporters. Maruinense competed in the Série C in 1994, when they reached the Quarterfinals of the competition being eliminated by Uberlândia, and in 1995, when they were eliminated in the First Round of the competition. They won the Campeonato Sergipano Série A2 in 2003.

Achievements

 Campeonato Sergipano Série A2:
 Winners (2): 2003,2020

Stadium
Centro Sportivo Maruinense play their home games at Estádio Governador Antônio Carlos Valadares, nicknamed Vavazão. The stadium has a maximum capacity of 10,235 people.

References

Association football clubs established in 1917
Football clubs in Sergipe
1917 establishments in Brazil